The 2010 Ronde van Gelderland was the 8th running of the Ronde van Gelderland, a women's bicycle race in  Gelderland, the Netherlands. It was rated by the UCI as a 1.2 category race.

Results

s.t. = same timeSource

References

External links
  

Ronde van Gelderland
2010 in Dutch sport
2010 in women's road cycling
April 2010 sports events in Europe